Fool Coverage is a 1952 Warner Bros. Looney Tunes cartoon directed by Robert McKimson. The cartoon was released on December 13, 1952, and stars Daffy Duck and Porky Pig.

In the short, Daffy is an insurance salesman, trying to sell a reluctant Porky a "full coverage" policy.

Plot
Porky answers the door to find Daffy, a pushy insurance salesman representing the Hotfoot Casualty Underwriters Insurance Company of Schenectady, who tries to convince Porky to purchase an insurance policy promising $1 million for a simple black eye. Although Porky is briefly tempted, he shows Daffy to the door. Daffy, unwilling to give up, returns and follows Porky around the house, warning him of the dangers of everyday domestic life. When Porky lights a match to retrieve a screwdriver from the oven, Daffy reminds Porky of the risk of explosion, urging him to use a flashlight instead. When Daffy demonstrates, the oven explodes in his face, prompting him to comment: "Must've been a short in my battery!".

Daffy then stuffs Porky's closet with a range of improbable objects. Daffy asks for each item in turn, only to be told by Porky that he owns no such thing. Finally, Daffy asks for a yo-yo; Porky tells Daffy to look in the closet. Forgetting the trap he has set, Daffy runs to the closet and opens the door, whereupon everything clatters down onto him. Another has him sawing a hole in the floor and covering it with a rug, only to fall down it himself, and replacing a candle with a stick of dynamite (though why such a thing would be in Porky's home is unknown) which results in the explosion sending him flying through the roof.

Ultimately, Porky is convinced that his home is indeed full of hazards, and he agrees to take out the insurance policy. Daffy soon reveals the fine print, according to which the $1 million will be paid only for a black eye incurred in the course of a stampede of wild elephants in his house between 3:55 and 4:00 pm on the Fourth of July during a hailstorm. Porky is momentarily chastened, but then a stampede of wild elephants comes through the living room. Daffy nervously looks at his watch, which reads 3:57 pm, and at the calendar, which reads July 4. Outside, hail is pouring down. Porky displays his black eye and demands to be paid, but Daffy refuses with the lie that the provision was in fact for a stampede of wild elephants and one baby zebra, whereupon a baby zebra follows the elephants through the room. Daffy proclaims "And one baby zebra!" and faints, realizing that he'll have to pay Porky no matter how he tries to change up the fine print to avoid it.

Home media
This cartoon can be found, restored and with its original opening and closing title sequences, in the
Looney Tunes Super Stars' Porky & Friends: Hilarious Ham.

See also
 List of Daffy Duck cartoons
 Porky Pig filmography

References

External links
 

1952 animated films
1952 short films
1952 films
Looney Tunes shorts
Warner Bros. Cartoons animated short films
Films directed by Robert McKimson
Daffy Duck films
Porky Pig films
1950s Warner Bros. animated short films
Films scored by Carl Stalling
1950s English-language films
Films about salespeople